Meteomedia is a company founded by Jörg Kachelmann, which operates a large network of Weather stations in Switzerland, Austria and Germany. The company's services include weather forecasts, severe weather warnings and meteorological consultancy. In 2013, MeteoGroup acquired Meteomedia. Since March 2014 Meteomedia trades under name and brand of MeteoGroup.

References

External links 
 MeteoGroup
 meteocentrale
 severe weather centrale Germany

Mass media companies of Switzerland
Meteorological companies